Cassinia macrocephala is a species of flowering plant in the family Asteraceae and is endemic to northern New South Wales. It is a shrub with narrow linear leaves and spherical, white to cream-coloured or yellowish-green heads.

Description
The flowers heads are spherical, white to cream-soloured or yellowish-green and arranged on a peduncle, each head with five to seventeen white florets surrounded by involucral bracts.

Taxonomy and naming
Cassinia macrocephala was first formally described in 2004 by Anthony Edward Orchard in Australian Systematic Botany from specimens collected near Moonbi in 2004. The specific epithet (macrocephala) means "large-headed".

In the same journal, Orchard described two subspecies and in 2006 two further subspecies in a later edition of Australian Systematic Botany, and the names of the four subspecies are accepted by the Australian Plant Census:

Distribution and habitat
This species of Cassinia grows on granite soils in forest in New South Wales. Subspecies macrocaphala occurs on the Northern Tablelands, subsp. petrapendula is only found in a restricted area near Nundle, and subsp. storyi is only known from the type location near Coolah Tops and subsp. tenuis'' near Inverell.

References

macrocephala
Asterales of Australia
Flora of New South Wales
Plants described in 2004